János Bognár (24 April 1914 – 8 March 2004) was a Hungarian cyclist. He competed in the individual and team road race events at the 1936 Summer Olympics.

References

External links
 

1914 births
2004 deaths
Hungarian male cyclists
Olympic cyclists of Hungary
Cyclists at the 1936 Summer Olympics
Cyclists from Budapest